In computer science, algebraic semantics is a form of axiomatic semantics based on algebraic laws for describing and reasoning about program specifications in a formal manner.

Syntax
The syntax of an algebraic specification is formulated in two steps: (1) defining a formal signature of data types and operation symbols, and (2) interpreting the signature through sets and functions.

Definition of a signature
The signature of an algebraic specification defines its formal syntax. The word "signature" is used like the concept of "key signature" in musical notation.

A signature consists of a set  of data types, known as sorts, together with a family  of sets, each set containing operation symbols (or simply symbols) that relate the sorts.
We use  to denote the set of operation symbols relating the sorts  to the sort .

where  denotes the empty string.

Set-theoretic interpretation of signature

An algebra  interprets the sorts and operation symbols as sets and functions.

With respect to the signature of integer stacks, we interpret the sort  as the set  of integers, and interpret the sort  as the set  of integer stacks. We further interpret the family of operation symbols as the following functions:

Semantics

Semantics refers to the meaning or behavior. An algebraic specification provides both the meaning and behavior of the object in question.

Equational axioms

The semantics of an algebraic specifications is defined by axioms in the form of conditional equations.

With respect to the signature of integer stacks, we have the following axioms:

where "" indicates "not found".

Mathematical semantics

The mathematical semantics (also known as denotational semantics) of a specification refers to its mathematical meaning.

The mathematical semantics of an algebraic specification is the class of all algebras that satisfy the specification.
In particular, the classic approach by Goguen et al. takes the initial algebra (unique up to isomorphism) as the "most representative" model of the algebraic specification.

Operational semantics

The operational semantics of a specification means how to interpret it as a sequence of computational steps. 

We define a ground term as an algebraic expression without variables. The operational semantics of an algebraic specification refers to how ground terms can be transformed using the given equational axioms as left-to-right rewrite rules, until such terms reach their normal forms, where no more rewriting is possible.

Consider the axioms for integer stacks. Let "" denote "rewrites to".

Canonical property
 
An algebraic specification is said to be confluent (also known as Church-Rosser) if the rewriting of any ground term leads to the same normal form. It is said to be terminating if the rewriting of any ground term will lead to a normal form after a finite number of steps. The algebraic specification is said to be canonical (also known as convergent) if it is both confluent and terminating. In other words, it is canonical if the rewriting of any ground term leads to a unique normal form after a finite number of steps. 

Given any canonical algebraic specification, the mathematical semantics agrees with the operational semantics.

As a result, canonical algebraic specifications have been widely applied to address program correctness issues. For example, numerous researchers have applied such specifications to the testing of observational equivalence of objects in object-oriented programming. See Chen and Tse as a secondary source that provides a historical review of prominent research from 1981 to 2013.

See also 
 Algebraic semantics (mathematical logic)
 OBJ (programming language)
 Joseph Goguen

References 

Formal methods
Logic in computer science
Formal specification languages
Programming language semantics